The Sea Hornet is a 1951 American adventure film directed by Joseph Kane and written by Gerald Drayson Adams. The film stars Rod Cameron, Adele Mara, Lorna Gray, Chill Wills, Jim Davis and Richard Jaeckel. The film was released on November 6, 1951, by Republic Pictures.

Plot

A merchant ship sunk off the California Coast during World War Two with a million dollars cash on board. Diver becomes romantically involved.

Cast    
Rod Cameron as Gunner McNeil
Adele Mara as Suntan Radford aka Goldbraid
Lorna Gray as Ginger Sullivan
Chill Wills as Swede
Jim Davis as Tony Sullivan
Richard Jaeckel as Johnny Radford
Ellen Corby as Mrs. Drinkwater
James Brown as Pete Hunter
Grant Withers as Rocky Lowe
William Ching as Sprowl
William Haade as Condor
Hal Taliaferro as Bone
Emil Sitka as Waiter 
Byron Foulger as Clerk
Monte Blue as Lt. Drake
Jack Pennick as Salty

References

External links

 

1951 films
American adventure films
1951 adventure films
Republic Pictures films
Films directed by Joseph Kane
Underwater action films
American black-and-white films
1950s English-language films
1950s American films